Jürgen Klinsmann (born 30 July 1964) is a German professional football manager and former player who is currently manager of South Korea national football team. Klinsmann played for several prominent clubs in Europe including VfB Stuttgart, Inter Milan, Monaco, Tottenham Hotspur, and Bayern Munich.  He was part of the West German team that won the 1990 FIFA World Cup and the unified German team that won the UEFA Euro 1996. As a manager, he managed the German national team to a third-place finish at the 2006 FIFA World Cup and was subsequently coach of a number of other teams including, notably, Bundesliga club Bayern Munich and the United States national team.

Considered one of Germany's premier strikers during the 1990s, he scored in all six major international tournaments he participated in, from the UEFA Euro 1988 to the 1998 FIFA World Cup. In 1995, he came in third in the FIFA World Player of the Year award; in 2004 he was named in the FIFA 100 list of the "125 Greatest Living Footballers". On 3 November 2016, he became the fifth player to be named as honorary captain of Germany.

Club career

1972–1981: Youth career
Klinsmann is one of four sons of master baker Siegfried Klinsmann (died 2005) and his wife Martha. At age eight, he began playing for TB Gingen, an amateur soccer club in Gingen an der Fils. Six months later, he scored 16 goals in a single match for his new club. At age ten, he moved to SC Geislingen. When he was 14 years old, his father bought a bakery in Stuttgart, the state capital. After the family relocated there, Klinsmann continued to play for SC Geislingen, even after he was spotted in a Württemberg youth selection. In 1978, aged 16, he signed a contract with Stuttgarter Kickers, the club where he would turn professional two years later. His parents decided he should first finish his apprenticeship as a baker in their family business, which he completed in 1982.

1981–1989: Stuttgarter Kickers and VfB Stuttgart

Klinsmann began his professional career in 1982 at the then-second division side Stuttgarter Kickers. By 1982–83, he was already a regular starter and by the end of the 1983–84 season, he had scored 19 goals for the club. Horst Buhtz, a Stuttgarter Kickers former coach, recalls Klinsmann benefited from intensive training from Horst Allman, who was one of the best sprint coaches in Germany at that time. At the beginning of the new season, he managed to improve his 100 m dash from 11.7 to 11.0 seconds.

In 1984, Klinsmann moved to first division rivals VfB Stuttgart. In his first season at the club, he scored 15 goals and was the team's joint top scorer with Karl Allgöwer. Despite his goal scoring efforts, he could not prevent his new club from finishing tenth in the league. During each of the 1985–86 and 1986–87 seasons, he scored 16 goals and reached the 1986 final of the DFB-Pokal, losing against Bayern Munich 2–5, but scoring the last goal of the match. In the 1987–88 season, he scored 19 goals – including a legendary overhead kick against Bayern – and was the Bundesliga's top goalscorer.

In 1988, the 24-year-old Klinsmann was named German Footballer of the Year. After reaching the 1988–89 UEFA Cup final with Stuttgart (eventually losing to Diego Maradona's inspired Napoli 5–4 on aggregate), Klinsmann moved to Italian club Inter Milan on a three-year contract, joining two other German internationals, Lothar Matthäus and Andreas Brehme.

1989–1992: Inter Milan
In spite of the heavily defensive orientated tactics of head coach Giovanni Trapattoni, Klinsmann scored 13 goals as the Nerazzurri finished third in Serie A. He became one of the most popular foreign players in Italy, mostly because he had learnt Italian and earned himself the respect of the fans with his appearance and language skills.

During the next season, Klinsmann won the UEFA Cup with Inter (2–1 on aggregate against Roma) and repeated his previous performance in the league with 14 goals; his contract was extended until 1994. A disastrous 1991–92 season caused all plans to fall through. Inter never managed to gain any momentum under coach Corrado Orrico and finished eighth in the league, with Klinsmann only scoring seven goals and the team being divided and fragmented into groups. It was clear for Klinsmann this would be his last season at the San Siro.

1992–1994: AS Monaco
After UEFA Euro 1992, Klinsmann moved to Monaco and catapulted the club to a second-place finish in the league in his first season. After the bribery scandal by Marseille and their subsequent disqualification as league winners, Monaco replaced them in the 1993–94 UEFA Champions League, reaching the semi-final before finally losing to eventual winners Milan. The following season, Monaco only managed a ninth-place finish in the league. Klinsmann, who had missed two months due to a torn ligament, was mostly deployed as a lone-striker and started criticizing the attitude of his teammates. In 1994, he left the club early, with one more year remaining on his contract.

1994–1995: Tottenham Hotspur
Klinsmann moved to Tottenham Hotspur in the Premier League for the 1994–95 season, where the fans and media were very critical of the German because of his reputation as a diver. He was signed by Spurs in July 1994 from Monaco for £2 million. On his debut against Sheffield Wednesday, he scored the winning header and immediately won over fans with his goal celebration by self-deprecatingly diving to the ground. A Guardian journalist who had written an article called "Why I Hate Jürgen Klinsmann", wrote another two months later called "Why I Love Jürgen Klinsmann". Klinsmann went on to win the 1995 Football Writers' Association Footballer of the Year.

Because of his humour, but also because of his athletic achievements and his combative playing style, Klinsmann quickly became extremely popular in England; over 150,000 of his shirts were sold. He now holds legendary status at Spurs and was inducted into Madame Tussauds Wax Museum.

Klinsmann scored 21 goals in the 1994–95 season for Spurs and a total of 30 in all competitions, including a late winner against Liverpool in the quarter-final of the FA Cup. He also found the net in the semi-final, but Spurs missed out on a place in the final by losing 4–1 to Everton.

1995–2003: Final years
Klinsmann then had a successful spell at Bayern Munich during the 1995–96 and 1996–97 season. He was the club's top goalscorer during both seasons, and won the 1995–96 UEFA Cup, setting a new goalscoring record of 15 goals in 12 matches during the competition (a record that stood until 2011). A year later, he also became German champion as he won the Bundesliga.

He then briefly moved to Italy for Sampdoria, but left the team in the winter and returned to Tottenham Hotspur. During his second stint at Tottenham in the 1997–98 season, his goals saved the club from relegation, particularly the four goals he scored in a 6–2 win at Wimbledon. He played the last match of his high-level club career in 1998 on the final day of the Premier League against Southampton.

After retiring and moving to the United States, in 2003 Klinsmann played for Orange County Blue Star, an amateur team in the fourth-tier Premier Development League.

International career
Klinsmann made his first international appearance for West Germany in 1987 and ultimately collected 108 caps, making him the country's fourth-most capped player behind Lothar Matthäus, Miroslav Klose and Lukas Podolski. Klinsmann scored 47 goals for West Germany in top-level international matches, sharing the all-time fourth place with Rudi Völler, and only surpassed by Klose's record of 71 goals for the national team, Gerd Müller's 68 goals and Podolski's 49. Klinsmann scored 11 goals in the FIFA World Cup, ranking sixth all-time.

In 1987, Klinsmann made his debut for Germany against Brazil in a 1–1 draw. He participated in the 1988 Summer Olympics, winning a bronze medal; the 1988, 1992 and 1996 UEFA European Championships, reaching the final in 1992 and becoming champion in 1996. Klinsmann was the first player to score in three different European Championships. Five other players – Vladimír Šmicer, Thierry Henry, Zlatan Ibrahimović, Nuno Gomes and Cristiano Ronaldo – have since equalled this record.

Klinsmann was an important part of the West German team during the 1990 FIFA World Cup. After qualifying for the round of 16, Germany was to play the Netherlands, against whom they had lost two years earlier in Euro 88. After Rudi Völler was sent off in the 22nd minute, Klinsmann was forced to play as a lone striker. He scored the 1–0 opener and his performance received considerable praise. German newspaper Süddeutsche Zeitung wrote that "In the last decade, not a single forward of a DFB team has offered such a brilliant, almost perfect performance." After further victories over Czechoslovakia (1–0) and England (1–1 after extra time, 4–3 on penalties), he became a world champion after beating Argentina 1–0 in the final. Klinsmann is remembered for being fouled by the Argentinian Pedro Monzón, who was subsequently sent off, reducing Argentina to ten men. Many critics called the incident a prime example of Klinsmann's diving, a claim he contradicted. In an interview in 2004, he noted that the foul left a 15 cm gash on his shin.

Klinsmann also competed for the unified Germany team at the 1994 (five goals), and 1998 (three goals), World Cups. He became the first player to score at least three goals in three consecutive World Cups, later joined by Ronaldo of Brazil and compatriot Miroslav Klose. Klinsmann is currently the sixth-highest goalscorer at World Cups overall and the third-highest goalscorer for Germany in this competition, behind Klose (16 goals) and Gerd Müller (14).

Coaching career

Germany
On 26 July 2004, Klinsmann returned to Germany as the new head coach of the national team, succeeding former teammate and strike partner Rudi Völler. Klinsmann subsequently embarked on an aggressive program to revamp the management of the team. Bringing fellow German striker Oliver Bierhoff on board helped diffuse public relations duties of the previous combined post away from the actual coaching aspect of the position. Furthermore, he created a youth movement to breathe life into an aging squad on the heels of a disastrous showing at Euro 2004. In the run-up to the 2006 World Cup, Klinsmann attracted criticism from German fans and the media following poor results, such as the 4–1 loss to Italy. A particular subject of criticism was that Klinsmann commuted to Germany from the U.S., which was the target of a campaign by the tabloid Bild. Klinsmann previously eliminated some privileges Bild traditionally had with the national team, such as receiving the team lineup the day before a match and 24/7 exclusive access to the team. His largely offensive tactics have irritated some, who complained he ignored defensive football. He announced a squad of young players for the 2006 World Cup, basing his selection policy on performance, not reputation.

During the 2005 FIFA Confederations Cup, he regularly rotated his goalkeepers regardless of their performances, which drew the ire of Bayern Munich's Oliver Kahn. On 7 April 2006, Klinsmann finally decided to relegate Kahn to the bench and designated Arsenal's Jens Lehmann as his first choice goalkeeper. This choice followed Lehmann's performances in the 2005–06 UEFA Champions League in which his Arsenal team bowed out in the final against Barcelona.

In the 2006 World Cup, Germany's performances silenced Klinsmann's critics, which included the form of an English song: "Who Do You Think You Are Kidding Jurgen Klinsmann?" The team recorded three-straight wins against Costa Rica, Poland and Ecuador in the group stage, earning Germany first place in Group A. The first match of the knockout stage was a 2–0 victory over Sweden, and in the quarter-finals, Klinsmann's team defeated Argentina, winning 4–2 on penalties. The teams drew 1–1 after 120 minutes after an equalising goal from Miroslav Klose in the 80th minute.

In the semi-final on 4 July, Germany lost a close match with Italy 2–0 after goals in the final minutes of extra time from Fabio Grosso and Alessandro Del Piero. After the match, Klinsmann praised the performance of his young team. They beat Portugal 3–1 in the third place play-off, where he played Kahn instead of Jens Lehmann. The victory triggered a massive parade in Berlin the following day where Klinsmann and the team were honoured by the public.

Afterward, Franz Beckenbauer, previously a strident critic of Klinsmann's, declared his desire to see Klinsmann continue as coach. There was also widespread public support for Klinsmann due to his team's spirit and attacking style of play. The team's strong performance is thought by some to have renewed national pride and restored Germany's reputation as a top soccer nation. Due to his success coaching the national team, Klinsmann was awarded the Bundesverdienstkreuz.

Despite the highly acclaimed performance at the World Cup and the praise earned, Klinsmann declined to renew his contract, informing the German Football Association (DFB) of his decision on 11 July 2006. The decision was officially announced by the DFB on 12 July 2006. Klinsmann's assistant, Joachim Löw, was appointed as the new head coach at the same press conference. Klinsmann said, "My big wish is to go back to my family, to go back to leading a normal life with them... After two years of putting in a lot of energy, I feel I lack the power and the strength to continue in the same way."

Bayern Munich

In July 2008, Klinsmann took over as coach of Bayern Munich, succeeding Ottmar Hitzfeld. Klinsmann helped design a new player development and performance center for Bayern and then launched into molding the team for the Bundesliga and 2008–09 Champions League campaigns. Under his guidance, Bayern reached the quarter-final of the Champions League, losing to eventual champion Barcelona. Klinsmann was sacked on 27 April 2009 with five matches remaining. His final match was a 1–0 loss to Schalke 04. Bayern were in third-place at the time of the sacking. Klinsmann finished with a record of 25 wins, nine draws, and 10 losses in all competitions.

Following Klinsmann's time with Bayern, Bayern team captain Phillip Lahm wrote in his autobiography that Klinsmann's tenure with the club was a "failure" and that Klinsmann's lack of tactical instruction required the players to meet before kickoff to discuss strategy.

Toronto FC
In November 2010, Klinsmann was hired as a technical consultant for Major League Soccer (MLS) club Toronto FC to advise on an overhaul of the club's coaching and playing personnel, leading the club to hire Aron Winter as head coach and Paul Mariner as technical director the following year. Both Winter and Mariner would later be fired by the club during a last place finish in the 2012 season.

United States

On 29 July 2011, Klinsmann was named the 35th head coach of the United States national team, replacing previous manager Bob Bradley, who had been fired following a 4–2 loss to Mexico in the final of the 2011 CONCACAF Gold Cup.

The U.S. struggled in friendly games early in Klinsmann's tenure, losing four matches and drawing one before ending the 2011 season with a victory over Slovenia. On 29 February 2012, the U.S. national team recorded a historic 1–0 victory in a friendly match away against Italy, its first win against the four-time World Cup champions. On 15 August 2012, Klinsmann coached the U.S. to a historic 1–0 win against long time rivals Mexico in a friendly held at the Estadio Azteca, giving the U.S. its first victory in the stadium.

In 2013, Klinsmann led the U.S. team into the final round of qualification for the 2014 FIFA World Cup, beginning with a 2–1 loss at Honduras before earning a point with a scoreless draw against Mexico in the Azteca. On 2 June 2013, the United States played their centennial celebratory game against Germany, where Klinsmann coached them to a 4–3 win over his native country. On 28 July, Klinsmann coached the U.S. team to their fifth CONCACAF Gold Cup title, defeating Panama 1–0 in the final. On 10 September 2013, following a 2–0 win over Mexico, the United States secured qualification for the World Cup. On 12 December 2013, Klinsmann signed a new contract extension with the United States Soccer Federation (USSF), lasting until 2018.

2014 World Cup

Klinsmann surprised the U.S. football world in May 2014 by selecting five so-called "Jurgen Americans", players with American serviceman fathers and German mothers who had all been born and professionally trained in Germany, to the 23-men squad in the 2014 FIFA World Cup. His selection particularly received criticism when he cut all-time leading U.S. scorer Landon Donovan from the final roster for the 2014 World Cup following the team's preliminary training camp. Klinsmann described it as "the most difficult decision of [his] coaching career" but that he sees other players "slightly ahead of [Donovan]". Klinsmann faced further controversy after his son Jonathan posted a comment on Twitter ridiculing Donovan, causing some to speculate that the decision was influenced by personal animosity between Klinsmann and Donovan.

On 16 June, Klinsmann guided the United States to a 2–1 win over Ghana in their first match of the 2014 World Cup, behind an early strike from captain Clint Dempsey and a dramatic 86th-minute header from substitute John Brooks. On 22 June, his side drew 2–2 against Portugal in the second group match. A defensive miscue early in the game led to an easy Portugal goal, but Jermaine Jones equalized with a strike from 30 yards out in the second half. Then, in the 81st minute, Dempsey scored to give the U.S. a 2–1 lead. The score remained 2–1 until the final seconds of stoppage time where Cristiano Ronaldo sent a cross that was headed past U.S. goalkeeper Tim Howard by Silvestre Varela. On 26 June, the U.S. faced Germany. With possible elimination looming again as their round of 16 spot hung in the balance, the U.S. fell to the Germans, 1–0, but the hope of surviving the "group of death" remained alive in the Portugal–Ghana game in which Portugal defeated Ghana, 2–1, sending the U.S. to the round of 16.

The U.S. drew Belgium in the round of 16. After spending much of the match defending against Belgium's potent attack, with goalkeeper Tim Howard setting a World Cup finals record for saves in a match, the U.S. survived with a 0–0 score after 90 minutes, sending the match to extra time. After quickly falling behind 2–0 to Belgium in extra time, the U.S. cut the deficit in half in the 107th minute when substitute Julian Green volleyed in a lobbed through ball from Michael Bradley, but were unable to score a second and were eliminated.

2018 World Cup cycle
Klinsmann led the U.S. to a 1–0 win over Czech Republic to open the new 2018 World Cup cycle on 3 September, its first win over the Czechs. On 5 June 2015, Klinsmann guided the U.S. to a dramatic 4–3 win over the Netherlands in a friendly in Amsterdam and another friendly victory over Germany five days later.

The U.S. under Klinsmann finished fourth in the 2015 CONCACAF Gold Cup following losses to Jamaica in the semi-finals and Panama in the third place match, the team's worst performance in the tournament since 2000. In 2016, Klinsmann successfully advanced the U.S. through its first round of World Cup qualification out of a group containing Guatemala, Trinidad and Tobago, and St. Vincent and the Grenadines.

The U.S. opened the final World Cup qualification round in November 2016 with a 2–1 home defeat to Mexico and a 4–0 away defeat to Costa Rica. Following the losses, which left the U.S. at the bottom of the qualification table, Klinsmann was fired by the USSF on 21 November 2016, being replaced by LA Galaxy manager Bruce Arena, who had previously coached the team from 1998 to 2006. Ultimately, the U.S. failed to qualify for the 2018 FIFA World Cup.

Hertha BSC
On 27 November 2019, Klinsmann became the new manager of Hertha BSC, replacing Ante Čović.
On 11 February 2020 he announced via Facebook that he would step down as coach after having been in this position for just ten weeks. Despite stating his intention of remaining part of the club's supervisory board, he was ultimately barred from doing so as Hertha's investor Lars Windhorst publicly criticized his behavior, calling the manner of his departure "unacceptable".

South Korea
On 27 February 2023, Klinsmann was announced as the head coach of South Korea, replacing Paulo Bento on a contract until the conclusion of the 2026 FIFA World Cup.

Charity work and social engagements
In 1995, Klinsmann and some of his close friends founded the children charity foundation Agapedia, which stems from the Greek language and translates to "Love for Children". In 1997, Klinsmann, acting as the captain of the Germany national team, visited the Holocaust memorial place Yad Vashem in Israel alongside his coach Berti Vogts. This visit was televised around the globe and drew worldwide attention. Klinsmann is also a board member of the German Initiative Für die Zukunft lernen, which means "Learning for the future", and supports the education of young people about the Holocaust. In May 1999, Klinsmann donated all the proceeds from his farewell match (more than US$1 million) to different children's charity organizations. The match was a sell-out with 54,000 fans in Stuttgart's Mercedes-Benz Arena. Famous personalities such as Bryan Adams, Boris Becker and many others contributed to this event.

Personal life

Klinsmann was born in Göppingen. His family moved to Stuttgart when he was a teenager. Klinsmann's family operates a bakery in Stuttgart's Botnang district and consequently he is sometimes affectionately referred to as the "baker's son from Botnang". Klinsmann is in fact a journeyman baker, having served an apprenticeship. He is married to Debbie Chin, an American former model, and lives in Huntington Beach, California. Klinsmann and his wife have two children, Jonathan and Laila. Son Jonathan, a goalkeeper, has been capped at age group level for the United States U-20 team. Aside from German, Klinsmann is fluent in English, Italian and French, and is a certified commercial helicopter pilot. He is a naturalized U.S. citizen. Klinsmann has also worked as a pundit, working with ESPN for the 2010 World Cup, and with BBC Sport at the 2018 World Cup and 2020 European Championship. He works on ESPN FC as of 2021. He wrote the daily email newsletter from Qatar for BBC Sport during the World Cup 2022.

Controversial comments on the Iranian national football team 
On 25 November 2022, following Iran's 2–0 victory over Wales in the 2022 FIFA World Cup, Klinsmann received backlash after his controversial comments made on BBC. Klinsmann claimed that the reason Iran won was because they used dirty tactics to manipulate Guatemalan referee Mario Escobar and that it was a part of Iranian football culture to play dirty. He then went on to claim that Head Coach Carlos Queiroz was a failure during his stint at Colombia and Egypt, stating "This is not by coincidence, this is all [done] purposely ... This is just part of their culture." Carlos Queiroz responded inviting Klinsman to the Iran camp to show him what Iranian football culture truly is, and petitioned FIFA to remove him as a member of the Qatar 2022 Technical Study Group.

Career statistics

Club

International

Scores and results list West Germany's and Germany's goal tally first, score column indicates score after each Klinsmann goal.

Managerial

Honours

Player
Inter Milan
UEFA Cup: 1990–91

Bayern Munich
Bundesliga: 1996–97
UEFA Cup: 1995–96

West Germany and Germany
FIFA World Cup: 1990
UEFA European Championship: 1996; runner-up: 1992
Summer Olympic Games: 1988 Bronze medal
U.S. Cup: 1993

Individual
Goal of the Year (Germany): 1987
Bundesliga top scorer: 1987–88
kicker Bundesliga Team of the Season: 1987–88
Footballer of the Year (Germany): 1988, 1994
FIFA World Cup All-Star Team: 1990
Premier League Player of the Month: August 1994
Tottenham Hotspur Club Player of the Year: 1994
FWA Footballer of the Year: 1994–95 (Tottenham Hotspur)
Premier League PFA Team of the Year: 1994–95
ESM Team of the Year: 1994–95
IFFHS World's Top Goal Scorer: 1995
Ballon d'Or runner-up: 1995
FIFA World Player of the Year Bronze award: 1995
UEFA Cup Top Scorer: 1995–96
FIFA XI: 1996, 1999
FIFA 100

Manager
Germany
FIFA World Cup third place: 2006
FIFA Confederations Cup third place: 2005

United States
CONCACAF Gold Cup: 2013
CONCACAF Cup runner-up: 2015

Individual
German Football Manager of the Year: 2006
CONCACAF Coach of the Year: 2013

Literature
 Dietrich Schulze-Marmeling: Strategen des Spiels – Die legendären Fußballtrainer, Verlag Die Werkstatt, Göttingen 2005, S. 332ff.
 Jens Mende: Jürgen Klinsmann – Wie wir Weltmeister werden, Südwest-Verlag, München 2006, .
 Michael Horeni: Klinsmann. Stürmer Trainer Weltmeister. Scherz, Frankfurt/Main 2005, .

See also
 List of men's footballers with 100 or more international caps

References

External links

1964 births
Living people
People from Göppingen
Sportspeople from Stuttgart (region)
1990 FIFA World Cup players
1994 FIFA World Cup players
1998 FIFA World Cup players
2005 FIFA Confederations Cup managers
2006 FIFA World Cup managers
AS Monaco FC players
FC Bayern Munich managers
FC Bayern Munich footballers
Inter Milan players
FIFA 100
FIFA Century Club
FIFA World Cup-winning players
Bundesliga players
2. Bundesliga players
Bundesliga managers
CONCACAF Gold Cup-winning managers
Association football forwards
Footballers at the 1988 Summer Olympics
Expatriate footballers in England
Expatriate footballers in Italy
Expatriate footballers in Monaco
Expatriate soccer players in the United States
Expatriate football managers in South Korea
German expatriate footballers
German expatriate sportspeople in Italy
German expatriate sportspeople in Monaco
German expatriate sportspeople in England
German expatriate sportspeople in South Korea
German expatriate sportspeople in the United States 
German footballers
German football managers
Germany international footballers
Germany national football team managers
Germany under-21 international footballers
Germany youth international footballers
Kicker-Torjägerkanone Award winners
Ligue 1 players
Recipients of the Cross of the Order of Merit of the Federal Republic of Germany
Recipients of the Order of Merit of Baden-Württemberg
Orange County Blue Star players
Olympic bronze medalists for West Germany
Olympic footballers of West Germany
Sportspeople from Newport Beach, California
Premier League players
Serie A players
Stuttgarter Kickers players
Tottenham Hotspur F.C. players
U.C. Sampdoria players
UEFA Euro 1988 players
UEFA Euro 1992 players
UEFA Euro 1996 players
UEFA European Championship-winning players
UEFA European Championship-winning captains
United States men's national soccer team managers
Hertha BSC managers
South Korea national football team managers
USL League Two players
VfB Stuttgart players
West German footballers
Olympic medalists in football
German expatriate football managers
2014 FIFA World Cup managers
Copa América Centenario managers
Footballers from Baden-Württemberg
UEFA Cup winning players
2015 CONCACAF Gold Cup managers
Medalists at the 1988 Summer Olympics
Naturalized citizens of the United States
West German expatriate footballers
West German expatriate sportspeople in Italy